Magoo Marjon is a Filipino sports play-by-play commentator.

Career
Marjon started his career in 2008 as a courtside reporter for the Philippine Basketball Association games when it was still produced by Solar TV. He was then elevated as a commentator for the radio coverage of the games. When Sports5 took over as the coverer of the PBA games in 2010, Marjon was assigned as a play-by-play commentator. He also serves as a play-by-play commentator for other basketball leagues covered by Sports5, notably for the Pilipinas Commercial Basketball League (PCBL), PBA Developmental League (PBA D-League) and for international basketball tournaments such as the FIBA Asia Championship (2013 and 2015), 2014 FIBA World Cup, and 2016 Rio Olympics among others.

References

Living people
Filipino television journalists
Sports commentators
Philippine Basketball Association broadcasters
Year of birth missing (living people)